Solly's Grille is a Glendale, Wisconsin hamburger restaurant thought to be the creator of the butter burger.

History
The Fieber family has owned the restaurant since 1936, and it is named after Glenn Fieber‘s stepfather Kenneth Salmon, known as Solly. When it opened, the restaurant was called Solly’s Coffee Shop, but Glenn renamed it Solly’s Grille in 1993 when he bought the restaurant from his mother.

Though open since 1936, it has been in its current location since 1971.

Honors and awards
In 2022, they were named a James Beard America’s Classic.

References

Hamburger restaurants in the United States
Restaurants in Wisconsin
James Beard Foundation Award winners